Marousi, also known as Maroussi, is an Athens Metro station in Marousi, a northern suburb in Athens.

The station is managed by STASY, and was rebuilt with step-free access as part of the renovation of Line 1 in 2004.

History 

At the same site there was a station of the former Lavrion Square-Strofyli railway at km 13.320 from Lavriou Square station. It was opened on 4 February 1885 and shut down on 8 August 1938.

The current metro station, on an elevated viaduct, opened on 1 September 1957: in 2004, ISAP renovated the station with a new roof and step-free access.

Proposals 

Since the late 1990s, Attiko Metro and the Greek government have proposed that Marousi would serve a second metro line. In December 2005, Attiko Metro revised the proposal to a U-shaped Line 4 from this station to  via , because they believed that the branch would have limited the capacity of Line 3.

Layout

References

External links
 
 STASY S.A. - Marousi

Athens Metro stations
Railway stations opened in 1957
1957 establishments in Greece
Transport in North Athens
Buildings and structures in North Athens
Marousi